Carrarese Calcio 1908, commonly referred to as Carrarese, is an Italian football club based in Carrara, Tuscany. It currently plays in Serie C, having last been in Serie B in 1948.

History 
The club was founded in 1908.

In the season 2010–11 from Lega Pro Seconda Divisione group B, Carrarese was promoted in the play-off to Lega Pro Prima Divisione.

In 2016 Carrarese Calcio S.r.l. went bankrupt. A new company Carrarese Calcio 1908 S.r.l., successfully bid the sports title by refurbished the debt of Carrarese Calcio S.r.l.

Colours and badge 
The team's colours are light blue and yellow.

Ownership 
Italian international and Juventus goalkeeper Gianluigi Buffon (a native of Carrara and prominent supporter of the club) was a major shareholder of the club, as part of a consortium that acquired the club in 2010; other shareholders included former Pisa Calcio chairman Maurizio Mian and long-time Serie A striker Cristiano Lucarelli.

Players

Current squad

Out on loan

Honours
Coppa Italia Serie C
Winners: 1982–83

References

External links 
Official site

 
Football clubs in Tuscany
Association football clubs established in 1908
Serie B clubs
Serie C clubs
Serie D clubs
1908 establishments in Italy
Coppa Italia Serie C winning clubs